Q Division Records is an independent record label located in Somerville, Massachusetts founded in 1995.

Artists
Merrie Amsterburg
Flying Nuns
Francine
Gigolo Aunts
Loveless
Rachael Cantu
Anne Heaton
Eli "Paperboy" Reed & The True Loves
The Gravel Pit
The Right Ons

See also
 List of record labels

External links
 http://www.qdivision.com/

Record labels established in 1986
American independent record labels
Indie rock record labels
Somerville, Massachusetts
1986 establishments in Massachusetts